Kanke is a place in Ranchi District, Jharkhand, India.

Kanke may also refer to:
Kanke (Vidhan Sabha constituency), an assembly constituency in Jharkhand, India
Kanke block, an administrative block of Ranchi District, Jharkhand, India
Kanke, Nigeria, a Local Government Area in Plateau State, Nigeria
Kanke Rōka, the Sugawara Family Hall run by Sugawara no Michizane